Shaman-Gora is an archeological site on the outskirts of the village of Duty in Khiloksky District of Zabaykalsky Krai. It is famous for its about 100 petroglyphs dating from 4000–1000 BCE. It is thought to be a ritual site for the local tribes. There are two main strata and their artifacts show that there was a highly developed society in the region at the confluence of the Duty River and Arey Rivers.

References

External links

Rock art in Asia
Geography of Russia